The Istanbul Championship League was a soccer league that operated for just one year, 1914.  Fenerbahçe S.K. won this league.

League table
1. Fenerbahçe 
2. Türk İdman Ocağı 
3. Darüşşafaka SK 
4. Hilal 
5. Darülmuallimin

Defunct football leagues in Turkey
1914 establishments in the Ottoman Empire
Sport in Istanbul
1914 disestablishments in the Ottoman Empire